The Indiana Convention Center is a major convention center located in Downtown Indianapolis, Indiana. The original structure was completed in 1972 and has undergone five expansions. In total, there are 71 meeting rooms, 11 exhibit halls, and three multi-purpose ballrooms. The connected facilities of Lucas Oil Stadium offer an additional  of exhibit space and 12 meeting rooms.

History 

Originally named the Indiana Convention-Exposition Center, groundbreaking for the $26.1 million venue occurred December 8, 1969. Completed in 1972, the original project included one ballroom, three exhibition halls, and 23 meeting rooms encompassing . The first major expansion to the Indiana Convention Center added one ballroom, two exhibit halls, and 16 meeting rooms, increasing total rentable space to —concurrent with construction of the adjoining 60,500-seat Hoosier Dome, later renamed the RCA Dome, both completed in 1984. The combined cost was around $94.7 million.

The convention center was expanded again from 1992 to 1993. The project also included skywalk connections to the Westin Indianapolis and Hyatt Regency Indianapolis (via Plaza Park Garage). Another expansion followed in 2000. The project included a skywalk connection to the Indianapolis Marriott Downtown.

Construction of the 67,000-seat Lucas Oil Stadium began in September 2005 one block south of the RCA Dome. Upon completion of Lucas Oil Stadium, the RCA Dome was demolished. The iconic air-lifted dome was deflated and the implosion of the stadium was completed in December 2008. The convention center's most recent and largest expansion was undertaken from 2008 to 2010, opening in January 2011. A $275 million  addition was constructed on the site of the former RCA Dome. As part of the expansion, an underground walkway along the west side of Capitol Avenue was built to directly connect this new portion of the facility to Lucas Oil Stadium. A skywalk was also built to connect the convention center with the JW Marriott Indianapolis (via the Government Center Washington Street Parking Facility), which was completed in 2011.

Ratio Architects, Inc. was the lead architectural firm for the expansion, assisted by other Indiana companies, BSA LifeStructures, Blackburn Architects, and Domain Architecture Inc. Indianapolis-based Shiel Sexton Co. Inc. was the lead construction manager, in association with Powers & Sons Construction Company Inc.

In addition to its space, the Indiana Convention Center now possesses 49 loading docks, seven drive-in ramps, and three food courts. It is also connected to 12 hotels and 4,700 hotel rooms via skywalks, the most of any U.S. convention center.

In September 2020, Indianapolis City-County Council unanimously approved a $155 million bond measure to build a  ballroom,  of meeting and pre-function space, and two high-rise hotels developed by Kite Realty, totaling 1,400 rooms. The first hotel, branded as a Signia by Hilton, is planned to be completed in 2024.

Notable events
The Indiana Convention Center has been the host to a large variety of meetings and conventions. These include:

Annual events
Big Ten Football Championship Game Fan Fest
FDIC International (1994–present)
Gen Con (2003–present)
Indiana Black Expo Summer Celebration
Indiana Comic Con (2010–present)
Indianapolis Auto Show
Indy PopCon (2014–present)
National FFA Convention & Expo (2006–2012, 2016–present)
Performance Racing Industry Trade Show (1998–2004, 2013–present)

Past events

Miss Gay America (September 1986)
1987 Pan American Games (August 1987)
Boxing
Fencing
Field Hockey
Modern Pentathlon
Rhythmic Gymnastics
General Council of the Assemblies of God (August 2000)
Antiques Roadshow (2001 and 2016)
Star Wars Celebration II (May 2002)
USA Wrestling 2003 Senior World Team Trials (June 2003)
Star Wars Celebration III (April 2005)
NCAA Bracket Town (April 2010)
NFL Super Bowl Experience (January–February 2012)
NCAA Final Four Fan Fest (April 2015)
NCAA Tourney Town
Women's Basketball Final Four (March–April 2011) 
Women's Basketball Final Four (March–April 2016) 
National Rifle Association
143rd Annual Meetings & Exhibits (April 2014)
148th Annual Meetings & Exhibits (April 2019)
Church of the Nazarene
2013 General Assembly and Conventions (June 2013)
2017 General Assembly and Conventions (June 2017)
NFL Scouting Combine Experience (2017 and 2018)
United Pentecostal Church International
North American Youth Congress (2017)
UPCI General Conference 2019
UPCI General Conference 2021
Church of God In Christ Auxiliaries in Ministry Convention (2018)
National Catholic Youth Conference (1991, 2001, 2011, 2013, 2015, 2017, 2019)
2021 NCAA Division I men's basketball tournament (March–April 2021)

Public art
 Female Tourist – Public artwork by American artist Tom Otterness
 Free Money – Public artwork by American artist Tom Otterness
 King at Rest – Public artwork by American artist Lorenzo Ghiglieri
 Male Tourist – Public artwork by American artist Tom Otterness

See also
 List of convention centers in the United States
 List of attractions and events in Indianapolis

References

External links

Indiana Convention Center & Lucas Oil Stadium

Tourist attractions in Indianapolis
Buildings and structures in Indianapolis
Boxing venues in Indiana
Wrestling venues in Indiana
Convention centers in Indiana
Buildings and structures completed in 1972
1972 establishments in Indiana